Index Living Mall Public Company Limited is a Thailand-based furniture retailer owned by Index Interfurn Group. With a concept of a "special mall" entirely devoted to displaying and selling the company's furniture, the company opened its first branch in December 2002 at Future Park Rangsit in suburban Bangkok. , the company has 31 branches throughout Thailand.

Apart from Thailand, future locations include seven new malls in India in five years, six outlets in Indonesia, Dubai, UAE and Russia Barnaul.

See also
 List of shopping malls in Thailand

References

External links
 Official site

Companies based in Bangkok